"Been to Hell" is a song by American rap rock band Hollywood Undead. It is the second single from their second full-length album, American Tragedy, and the first track on that album. It is the band's eighth overall single in their discography. The track was released as a free download on the band's official website on February 5, 2011. It was later released as a single on March 15 and accompanied an official music video the same day. A remix was featured on the band's American Tragedy Redux remix album.

Background
The band had been recording for a second album since early 2010, also in the midst of The United States 2010 Recession. This caused an eventual peak of 14% unemployment in the band's state of California. The recession caused a partial motivation for Been to Hell'''s lyrics of failure and the darker tone. The song is specifically about people who come to Hollywood expecting to achieve greatness and fame, but are unable to accomplish this for reasons of drugs, temptation, and apathy. When speaking about the track's message, J-Dog says it's about "The truth about what really happens to people when they move to LA, to be actors or models or god knows what other delusions people have... failure. It's all too true, but most people aren't there to see it first hand... But we are, so it's our interpretation of it all. And make sure you stick around til the end..."

The first surfacing of the track was on January 11, 2011, when the band officially announced the title of their second album, American Tragedy, and released a short one-minute preview video of the album. The video included an instrumental of Been to Hell, which was untitled at the time. The track was the third song released following the first single, "Hear Me Now", and the promotional single, "Comin' in Hot". The full song was released on the band's official website at midnight on February 5 as a free download to add fans to their mailing list and to promote the album. In addition, an official lyric video was released that showed flashes of Los Angeles and the band's new masks, an elaboration of the album's preview video. The track was removed as a free download a few weeks later before it was released as a single and put on iTunes on March 15, 2011. The music video was co-directed by Jeff Janke and Corey Soria, with a cameo by porn star Peter North.

A remix of the song by KMFDM titled "Been to Hell... and Back!" was included on the 2011 remix album American Tragedy Redux.

Music video

On March 15, an official music video was released on iTunes, but was available for free to people who pre-ordered the album from iTunes. The video was posted on the band's official website three days later on March 18 for viewing. Differing from the official lyrics video for the song, the music video shows clips of Los Angeles and the band performing. The band is shown playing in an underground garage with two podiums holding a drum kit on one and some percussion instruments and a keyboard on the other. Da Kurlzz plays the percussion and keyboards while the band's touring member, Daren Pfeifer, plays the drums in the video without any mask. J-Dog raps the first verse, Johnny 3 Tears raps the second, and Charlie Scene raps the third. The choruses are sung by Danny with Charlie Scene doing background vocals. When the band is performing, a few shots of the member performing has every other member in the background shown to be frozen in motion, even if there is a part for their instrument at the time.
The Story was written by Jeff Janke and Directed by Jeff Janke and Corey Soria. The two Directors have been friends since high school and played in bands together for many years.
In the parts that the band isn't performing, clips of various people and places are shown. Places shown around Los Angeles include: La Brea Avenue, Santa Monica Pier, The Los Angeles Metro system, Hollywood Boulevard, and The Los Angeles Train Station. A few characters an Actress, Model and a Musician are shown as they journey to Los Angeles to gain fame through various professions. One girl (played by pornographic actress Brittany Beth aka BiBi Jones) comes to the city and tries for a model shoot but then is pushed to pose nude and sacrifice her morals to become a model. She is shown later to have become a stripper, then a porn star, and had lost her chance at modeling. The next character is a man (played by Jake Terrell, the brother of Charlie Scene) who flew to L.A. with a guitar and tries out for several bands but is unsuccessful. He resorts to open mic nights at a club then panhandling on the side of the road.  He eventually becomes a roadie for Hollywood Undead, as it says on the backstage pass he has, and is seen putting and tuning instruments on the stage where Hollywood Undead is singing their song Been To Hell. The last character is a brunette girl (played by Amber Goetz) who comes happily to L.A. and is taken in by the sights. She visits the Hollywood Walk of Fame and later tries to become an actress. Throughout the video she is seen frustrated at auditions and panic-struck crossing out days in her audition schedule. She also fails and eventually becomes a waitress. Later she finds one of her audition photos stained with coffee in the diner she works at. The video ends with the brunette Amber Goetz becoming depressed and jumping off of at the  Hollywood Sign, committing suicide. The 3 characters stories are mixed together with clips of dilapidated areas and other people like homeless people, symbolizing the failure of the dream of fame, which is the main idea presented in the song's lyrics.

Reception

Commercial
The single debuted at number thirteen on the Billboard'' Heatseekers Songs chart and number 2 on the Bubbling Under Hot 100.

Chart performance

Accolades

Personnel
Hollywood Undead
J-Dog – vocals, bass
Charlie Scene – lead guitar, rapping
Da Kurlzz – unclean vocals
Danny – vocals
Funny Man – gang vocals
Johnny 3 Tears – vocals

Additional
Dean Butterworth – drums
Ben Grosse – mixing
Bart Hendrickson – programming
BC Smith – keyboards, programming

References

2011 singles
Hollywood Undead songs
2011 songs
A&M Records singles